Richard Durand (born 5 April 1976) is a Dutch disc jockey and record producer. His real name is Richard van Schooneveld

Biography

Starting his career in 2005, Durand was recommended by Tiësto as his 'Tip For the Top in 2007' in DJ Magazine. In that same year, he was placed in the DJ Magazine Top 100 DJs poll.

His first creations were tech trance singles "Make Me Scream" and "Slipping Away" on the Terminal 4 label, but his real success started with remixes of Tiësto singles "Lethal Industry", "Flight 643" and "Break My Fall", and reworks of The Prodigy's "Smack My Bitch Up" and Snow Patrol's "Chasing Cars" which brought him into the playlist of DJs such as Armin van Buuren, Paul van Dyk, Ferry Corsten, Judge Jules and Eddie Halliwell.

In 2008, Durand remixed Fragma's "Toca's Miracle" and Armin van Buuren's "In and Out of Love". His solo productions included "Weep" featuring Skin from Skunk Anansie on vocals, which was signed to Perfecto Records.

In 2009, Durand remixed Art of Trance's "Madagascar" followed by his debut artist album Always the Sun on Magik Muzik/Black Hole Recordings. The album spawned three singles: "Into Something", "Always the Sun" and "No Way Home".

Discography

Albums
 Always the Sun (2009)
 Wide Awake (2011)
 Richard Durand Versus The World (2012)
 The Air We Breathe (2018)
 Reactivate (2022)

DJ mixes
 Portrait (2013)

In Search of Sunrise series
 In Search of Sunrise 8: South Africa (2010)
 In Search of Sunrise 9: India (2011)
 In Search of Sunrise 10: Australia (2012)
 In Search of Sunrise 11: Las Vegas (2013)
 In Search of Sunrise 12: Dubai (2014)
 In Search of Sunrise 13.5: Amsterdam (2015)

Singles

Remixes
Armin van Buuren - "Wild Wild Son" (Richard Durand Remix) (ft. Sam Martin)
Art of Trance - "Madagascar" (Richard Durand Remix)
Ruben de Ronde & Roxanne Emery - "Gold" (Richard Durand Remix)
Tiësto - "Traffic" (Richard Durand Remix)
Tiësto - "Lethal Industry" (Richard Durand Remix)
Armin van Buuren - "In and Out of Love" (Richard Durand Remix) (ft. Sharon den Adel)
Tiësto - "Flight 643" (Richard Durand Remix)

References

External links
Official website
Richard Durand Discography

1976 births
Living people
Dutch DJs
Musicians from Amsterdam